Cavener is a surname. Notable people with the surname include:

 Beth Cavener Stichter (born 1972), American sculptor 
 Cliff Cavener (born 1967), English cricketer
 Douglas Cavener, American biologist
 Phil Cavener (born 1961), English footballer